Chao Na (born March 13, 1980) is a Chinese swimmer. She is a former World Champion and Olympic silver medalist. She was born in Beijing.

In 1995, Chao Na was selected for the 2nd FINA World Short Course Championships in Rio de Janeiro. She won a silver medal in the 100-metre freestyle and became world champion in the 4 x 100-metre freestyle relay. Two years later, at the 3rd FINA World Short Course Championships in Gothenburg, Chao Na again became world champion in the 4 x 100-metre freestyle relay. The winning Chinese relay team set a new world record, finishing at 3.34,55 minutes. The record remained unbeaten until 2006.

Chao Na participated at the 1996 Summer Olympics in Atlanta, winning a silver medal in 4 x 100-metre freestyle relay.

At the 1998 Asian Games in Bangkok, Chao Na won a silver medal in the 100-metre freestyle and swam to victory in the 4 x 100-metre freestyle relay.

References

External links

1980 births
Living people
Olympic swimmers of China
Olympic silver medalists for China
Swimmers at the 1996 Summer Olympics
World record setters in swimming
Chinese female freestyle swimmers
Medalists at the FINA World Swimming Championships (25 m)
Asian Games medalists in swimming
Medalists at the 1996 Summer Olympics
Asian Games gold medalists for China
Asian Games silver medalists for China
Olympic silver medalists in swimming
Medalists at the 1998 Asian Games
Swimmers at the 1998 Asian Games